3D memory may refer to:

3D optical data storage
Three-dimensional memory cells
V-NAND (3D NAND) flash memory
3D integrated circuit (3D IC) memory chips